Tazkiyah is an Arabic-Islamic term alluding to "tazkiyat al-nafs" meaning "sanctification" or "purification of the self". This refers to the process of transforming the nafs (carnal self or desires) from its deplorable state of self-centrality through various spiritual stages towards the level of purity and submission to the Will of Allah. Its basis is in learning the shari'ah and deeds from the known authentic sunnah and applying it in your own deeds through life resulting in spiritual awareness of Allah  (being constantly aware that He is with us by His knowledge and knows all that we do, along with being in constant remembrance or dhikr of Him in your thoughts and actions) being the highest level of Ihsan. The person who purifies himself/herself is called a Zaki.

Tazkiyah, along with the related concepts of tarbiyah – self-development and ta'lim – training and education, does not limit itself to the conscious learning process: it is rather the task of giving form to the act of righteous living itself: treating every moment of life with remembering one's position in front of Allah.

Etymology
Tazkiyah originally meant pruning the plant – to remove what is harmful for its growth. When the term is applied to the human personality, it means to beautify it and to remove from it all evil traces and spiritual diseases that are obstacles in experiencing Allah. In Islam, the ultimate objective of religion and shariah (Islamic law) and the real purpose of raising prophets from among mankind was performing and teaching tazkiyah.

Literally the term encompasses two meanings: one is to cleanse and purify from adulterants, while the other is to improve and develop towards the height of perfection. Technically it conveys the sense of checking oneself from erroneous tendencies and beliefs and turning them to the path of virtue and piety (fear of God's displeasure) and developing it to attain the stage of perfection.

The word zakat (alms tax) comes from the same Arabic verbal root, since zakat purifies an individual's wealth by recognition of Allah's right over a portion of it. It finds its origin in the Quranic command to: "Take sadaqah (charity) from their property in order to purify and sanctify them" (At-Taubah: 103). Other similarly used words to the term are Islah-i qalb (reform of the heart), Ihsan (beautification), taharat (purification), Ikhlas (purity), qalb-is-salim (pure/safe/undamaged heart) and lastly,  tasawuf (Sufism), which is basically an ideology rather than a term, mostly misinterpreted as the idea of sanctification in Islam.

In scripture

In Quran
The word Tazkiyah has been used in many places of the Qur'an. It has been used 18 times in 15 verses of 11 Surahs; in Ayat 129, 151, 174 of Surah Al-Baqarah, in 77 and 164 verse of sura Al-Imran, the verse of Nisa 49, Surah Taubah, verse 103, Sura taha's 76 ayat, in second verse of Sura Al-Jumm'ah, 3 and 7 ayat of Sura Abasa, in verse 21 of Surah al-A'la, verse 9 of Surah Shams and in the verse 18 of Surah al-Layl.

In Hadith
The word tazkiyah is also found in a few hadith, with also of a meaning as purify and santify.

Importance
The soul is created devoid of traits except for spirituality love of Allah. As one progresses through life he develops malakat related to his lifestyle. The soul becomes accustomed to repeated behavior, which then determines actions. Noble faculties manifest moral and wise behavior, while evil faculties manifest immorality. These faculties determine the fate in the akhira. Moral virtues bring eternal happiness and well-being (falaḥ), while moral corruption leads to everlasting wretchedness. Man must purge blameworthy traits (akhlāq madhmūma) before he can integrate ethical and moral virtues. According to the ulema, obtainment of falaḥ in this life and the next is directly connected to tazkiah. This is based on the Quranic verses: 

91:7 وَنَفْسٍ وَمَا سَوَّاهَا
 Wanafsin wamā sawwāhā
 Consider the human self, and how it is formed in accordance with what it is meant to be
91:8 فَأَلْهَمَهَا فُجُورَهَا وَتَقْوَاهَا
 Faalhamahā fujūrahā wataqwāhā
 And how it is imbued with moral failings as well as with consciousness of God!
91:9 قَدْ أَفْلَحَ مَن زَكَّاهَا
 Qad aflaḥa man zakkāhā
 To a happy state shall indeed attain he who causes this [self] to grow in purity
91:10 وَقَدْ خَابَ مَن دَسَّاهَا
 Waqad khāba man dassāhā
 And truly lost is he who buries it [in darkness].

This illustrates that Allah created the human soul with both evil and good inclinations, and endowed man with the ability to distinguish between the two: eternal falaḥ is achieved by choosing good in the struggle instead of evil and striving to make it prevail. Similarly, Allah says in sura as-shu'ara :  "On that Day, neither wealth nor children will be of any benefit, only he [will be happy] who comes before Allah with a sound heart free of evil." 

Thus, the only people who will be saved from punishment on the Day of Judgment are those possessing qulub salīma (sound hearts: بِقَلْبٍ سَلِيمٍ). The phrase "salīm" (sound) is related to the word "aslama" because "Islam" is moving towards that state of soundness.

Anas Karzoon offered the following definition of tazkiah al-nafs, "It is the purification of the soul from inclination towards evils and sins, and the development of its fitrah towards goodness, which leads to its uprightness and its reaching ihsaan." Attempts to obey God's commands are successful only when one is purified; then the soul can receive God's unlimited grace.

The hadith of the Prophet Muhammad: ("my religion is based on cleanliness"), does not refer to outward cleanliness alone; it also alludes to the soul's inner purity. Al-Khatib al-Baghdadi narrates in his "Tarikh" on the authority of Jabir that the Prophet returned from one of his campaigns and told his companions: "You have come forth in the best way of coming forth: you have come from the smaller jihad to the greater jihad." They said: "And what is the greater jihad?" He replied: "The striving (mujahadat) of Allah's servants against their idle desires."

When some Sufi masters were asked about the meaning of Islam, they answered: "[It is] slaughtering the soul by the swords of opposition [to it]." The famous Sufi master Mawlana Jalal al-Din al-Rumi has argued that the constant struggle against nafs is jihad al-akbar (the greatest war). To attain perfection, it is necessary to struggle against lusts and immoral tendencies, and prepare the soul to receive God's grace. If man travels the path of purification, God will aid and guide him. As the Qur'an maintains in sura al-Ankabut:

29:69 وَالَّذِينَ جَاهَدُوا فِينَا لَنَهْدِيَنَّهُمْ سُبُلَنَا وَإِنَّ اللَّهَ لَمَعَ الْمُحْسِنِينَ
 Waallathēna jahadū fēna lanahdiyannahum subulanā wainna Allaha lama'a almuḥsinēna
 But as for those who struggle hard in Our cause, We shall certainly guide them onto paths leading unto Us: for, behold, God is indeed with the doers of good.

Process
The initial awakening to purification refers to recognition that the spiritual search is more important and meaningful than our previously valued worldly goods and ambitions. The process of tazkiyat al-nafs starts with "Verily deeds are according to intentions" and ends with the station of perfect character, Ihsan, "Worship Him as though you see Him", the reference being to the first hadith in Sahih Bukhari and the oft referred hadith famously known as the hadith of Gibril in Sahih Muslim. Ihsan is the highest level of iman that the seeker can develop through his quest for reality. This is referred to as al-yaqin al-haqiqi; the reality of certainty and knowing that it brings true understanding and leads to al-iman ash-shuhudi, the true faith of witnessing the signs of Allah's Oneness everywhere. The only higher level of realization is maqam al-ihsan. At this station of perfection, the seeker realizes that Allah is observing him every moment.

Saudi cleric Khalid Bin Abdullah al-Musleh listed seven obstacles in the way of Tazkiyah in his book "Islahul Qulub" (reforming the hearts):
 Shirk
 Rejecting Sunnah and following Bid'ah
 Obeying the instinct and ego (nafs)
 Doubt
 Negligence (ghaflah)
Ha also listed 8 ways to maintain Tazkiyah:
 Reading Quran
 Loving Allah
 Doing dhikr
 Tawbah and Istighfar
 Supplicate (dua) for hidayah and purify
 Remembering afterlife (Akhirah)
 Reading the biographies of the salafs
 Company of good, honest and pious people.

Maintaining the Nafs
It must be remembered that tazkiah is not a hal (temporary state), which is something that descends from Allah into a seeker's heart, without him being able to repel it when it comes, or to attract it when it goes, by his own effort. The maqām and hal are deeply related and often it is very difficult to distinguish between them. To ascertain their relationship Professor A.J. Arberry, in his Sufism has shown the distinction as follows: "the maqām is a stage of spiritual attainment on the pilgrim's progress to God, which is the result of the mystic's personal efforts and endeavor, whereas the hal is a spiritual mood depending not upon the mystic but upon God." The Muslim philosopher Abd al-Karīm ibn Hawāzin al-Qushayri (b. 986 Nishapur, Iran d. 1074) summarized the difference between the two concepts in his Ar-Risāla-fi-'ilm-at-taşawwuf, where he maintained that, "states are gifts, the stations are earnings."

Tazkiah is a continuous process of purification to maintain spiritual health. Similar to the process of maintaining physical health, any lapse in the regimen can cause one to lose their previous gains, and thus caution must always be used to not deviate from the path. Regarding this, it has been related that Imam Muhammad al-Busayri asked Shaykh Abul-Hasan 'Ali ibn Ja'far al-Kharqani (d. 1033) about the major seventeen negative psychological traits or mawāni’ (impediments) which the sālik must avoid in his struggle towards purification. If the sālik does not rigorously abstain from these aspects, his efforts will be wasted. Known as al-Akhlaqu 'dh-Dhamimah (the ruinous traits), they are also referred to as the Tree of Bad Manners:

Stages of nafs (inner-self)
There are three principal stations of nafs or human consciousness that are specifically mentioned in the Qur'an. They are stages in the process of development, refinement and mastery of the nafs.
nafs-al-ammārah: unruly animal self or soul that dictates evil.
nafs-al-lawwāmah: struggling moral self or self-reproaching soul.
nafs al-mutma'inna: satisfied soul or the composed God realized self.

The animal nafs (nafs-al-ammārah)
The Sufi's journey begins with the challenge of freeing oneself from the influence of shaytan and the nafs-al-ammara. Al-Kashani defines it as follows: the commanding soul is that which leans towards the bodily nature (al-tabī'a al-badaniyya) and commands one to sensual pleasures and lusts and pulls the heart (qalb) in a downward direction. It is the resting place of evil and the source of blameworthy morals and bad actions. In its primitive stage the nafs incites us to commit evil: this is the nafs as the lower self or the base instincts. In the eponymous sura of the Qur'an, the prophet Yusef says "Yet I claim not that my nafs was innocent: Verily the nafs of man incites to evil."  Here he is explaining the circumstances in which he came to be falsely imprisoned for the supposed seduction of Zuleikā, the wife of Pharaoh's minister.
....

The reproachful nafs (nafs-al-lawwama)
If the soul undertakes this struggle it then becomes nafs-al-lawwama (reproachful soul): This is the stage where "the conscience is awakened and the self accuses one for listening to one's selfish mind. The original reference to this state is in sura Qiyama: 

75:2 وَلَا أُقْسِمُ بِالنَّفْسِ اللَّوَّامَةِ
 Walā oqsimu bialnnafsi al-lawwāmati
 I call to witness the regretful self (the accusing voice of man's own conscience)

The sense of the Arabic word lawwama is that of resisting wrongdoing and asking God's forgiveness after we become conscious of wrongdoing. At this stage, we begin to understand the negative effects of our habitual self-centered approach to the world, even though we do not yet have the ability to change. Our misdeeds now begin to become repellent to us. We enter a cycle of erring, regretting our mistakes, and then erring again.

Tree of good manners
Akhlaq-i-Hamidah - good character
As-Sidq - truthfulness

Tree of bad manners
al-ghadab – anger: considered the worst of all the negative traits. It may easily be said that anger is the source from which the others flow. The Prophet states in a hadith: "Anger (ghadab) blemishes one's belief." Controlling anger is called kāzm.
al-hiqd – malice or having ill-will toward others; grows from lusting for what someone else has. You must replace hiqd with kindness and look upon your brother with love. There is a tradition that says "give gifts to one another, for gifts take away malice."
al hasad – jealousy or envy; a person inflicted with this disease wants others to lose blessings bestowed on them by Allah.
al-'ujb – vanity or having pride because of an action, possession, quality or relationship.
al-bukhl – stinginess: The cause of bukhl is love of the world, if you did not love it, then giving it up would be easy. To cure the disease of miserliness, one must force oneself to be generous, even if such generosity is artificial; this must be continued until generosity becomes second nature.
al-tama – Greed - excessive desire for more than one needs or deserves. Having no limit to what one hoards of possessions! Seeking to fulfill worldly pleasures through forbidden means is called tama’. The opposite of tama’ is called tafwiz, which means striving to obtain permissible and beneficial things and expecting that Allah will let you have them.
al-jubn – cowardice: the necessary amount of anger (ghadab) or treating harshly is called bravery (shajā'at). Anger which is less than the necessary amount is called cowardice (junb). Imam Shafi says, "a person who acts cowardly in a situation which demands bravery resembles an ass." A coward would not be able to show ghayrat for his wife or relatives when the situation requires it. He would not be able to protect them and thus will suffer oppression (zulm) and depreciation (ziliat).
al-batalah – indolence or Sloth (deadly sin): batalah is inactivity resulting from a dislike of work.
al-riya’ – ostentation or showing off: riya’ means to present something in a manner opposite to its true nature. In short, it means pretension, i.e., a person's performing deeds for the next world to impress the idea on others that he is really a pious person with earnest desire of the akhirah while in fact he wants to attain worldly desires.
al-hirsh – attachment and love for the material world, such as desiring wealth and a long life.
al-'azamah – superiority or claiming greatness: the cure is to humble oneself before Allah.
al-ghabawah wa 'l-kasalah – heedlessness and laziness; "the heart needs nourishment, and heedlessness starves the spiritual heart."
al-hamm – anxiety: this develops from heedlessness. The seeker must first understand that Allah is al-Razzaq (the Provider), and submit and be content with the will of Allah.
al-ghamm – depression: passion (hawā) conduces to anguish (ghamm) whenever reason is allowed to represent itself as grievous or painful the loss of the suitable or desirable and is, therefore, a "rational affection" that can cause the soul untold suffering and perturbation.
al-manhiyat – Eight Hundred Forbidden Acts
ghaflah – neglect and forgetfulness of God, indifference: those guilty of ghaflah, the ghāfilün, are those who "know only a surface appearance of the life of this world, and are heedless of the hereafter" (30:7).
kibr – arrogance or regarding one's self to be superior to others. The Prophet states in a hadith: "A person who has an atom's weight of conceit in his heart will not enter Paradise." The opposite of arrogance is tawādu’, which is a feeling of equality.
hubb ul-dunya – love of the material world: Materialism. The Prophet has said that "love of the world is the root of all evil." If this ailment is treated and cured, all other maladies flowing from it will also disappear.

The sālik must purify himself from these bad traits and rid his heart of the underlying ailments that are at their source. Outward adherence to the five pillars of Islam is not sufficient: he must be perfect in behavior. This requires a program of self-evaluation, purification, seclusion and establishing a practice of remembrance and contemplation under the guidance of an authorized Shaykh of Spiritual Discipline (shaykh at-tarbiyyah). In this way the seeker is able to achieve a state in which his heart is ready to receive Divine Inspiration and observe Divine Realities.

The nafs at peace (nafs-i-mutma'inna)
The Qur'an explains how one can achieve the state of the satisfied soul in sura Ar-Ra'd: "Those who believe, and whose hearts find their rest in the remembrance of God – for, verily, in the remembrance of Allah do hearts find satisfaction (tatmainnu alquloobu)."  Once the seeker can successfully transcend the reproachful soul, the process of transformation concludes with nafs-al-mutma'inna (soul at peace). However, for some Sufis orders the final stage is nafs-as-safiya wa kamila (soul restful and perfected in Allah's presence). The term is conceptually synonymous with Tasawwuf, Islah al-Batini etc. Another closely related but not identical concept is tazkiah-al-qalb, or cleansing of the heart, which is also a necessary spiritual discipline for travelers on the Sufi path. The aim is the erasure of everything that stands in the way of purifying Allah's love (Ishq).

The aim of tazkiah and moral development is to attain falah or happiness, thus realizing the nafs al-mutma'inna. This is the ideal stage of mind for Sufis. On this level one is firm in one's faith and leaves bad manners behind. The soul becomes tranquil, at peace. At this stage Sufis have relieved themselves of all materialism and worldly problems and are satisfied with the will of God. Man's most consummate felicity is reflecting Divine attributes. Tranquillization of the soul means an individual's knowledge is founded on such firm belief that no vicissitudes of distress, comfort, pain or pleasure can alter his trust in Allah and his expecting only good from Him. Instead, he remains pleased with Allah and satisfied with His decrees. Similarly, the foundations of deeds are laid in such firm character that no temptations, in adversity, prosperity, fear or hope, removes him from the shar'iah, so he fulfills the demands made by Allah and thus becomes His desirable servant.

According to Qatada ibn al-Nu'man, the nafs al-mutma'inna is, "the soul of the believer, made calm by what Allah has promised. Its owner is at complete rest and content with his knowledge of Allah's Names and Attributes..."

In sura Fajr of the Quran, Allah addresses the peaceful soul in the following words: 

89:27 يَا أَيَّتُهَا النَّفْسُ الْمُطْمَئِنَّةُ
 Yā ayyatuhā alnnafsu almutmainnatu
 O thou human being that hast attained to inner peace!
89:28 ارْجِعِي إِلَى رَبِّكِ رَاضِيَةً مَّرْضِيَّةً
 Irji'aī ilā rabbiki radiyatan mardiyyatan
 Return thou unto thy Sustainer, well-pleased [and] pleasing [Him]:
89:29 فَادْخُلِي فِي عِبَادِي
 Fāodkhulī fī 'aibādī
 Enter, then, together with My [other true] servants
89:30 وَادْخُلِي جَنَّتِي
 Wāodkhulī jannatī
 Yea, enter thou My paradise!"

Sufi views

Maqamat of Tazkiah 
The level of human perfection is determined by discipline and effort. Man stands between two extremes, the lowest is below beasts and the highest surpasses the angels. Movement between these extremes is discussed by `ilm al-akhlaq or the science of ethics. Traditional Muslim philosophers believed that without ethics and purification (tazkiah), mastery over other sciences is not only devoid of value, but obstructs insight. That is why the Sufi saint Bayazid al-Bustami has said that, 'knowledge is the thickest of veils', which prevents man from seeing reality (haqiqah).

Sufi Brotherhoods (ṭarīqa pl. ṭuruq) have traditionally been considered training workshops where fundamental elements of tazkiah and its practical applications are taught. Sufis see themselves as seekers (murīdūn) and wayfarers (sālikūn) on the path to God. For proper training, murīdūn are urged to put themselves under the guidance of a master (murshid). The search for God (irāda, ṭalab) and the wayfaring (sulūk) on the path (ṭarīq) involve a gradual inner and ethical transformation through various stages. Although some have considerably more, most orders adopted seven maqāmāt (maqam pl. maqamat, a station on the voyage towards spiritual transformation). Although some of these stations are ascetical in nature, their primary functions are ethical, psychological and educational: they are designed as a means for combating the lower-self (mujāhadat al-nafs) and as a tool for its training and education (riyāḍat al-nafs).

In one of the earliest authoritative texts of Sufism, the Kitāb al-luma’, Abu Nasr al-Sarraj al-Tusi (d. 988), mentions seven maqāmāt that have become famous in later movements, they include:

Repentance (tawbah): Begins with nur-e-ma'rifat (light of Divine Recognition) in the heart that realizes sin is spiritual poison. This induces regret and a yearning to compensate for past shortcomings and determination to avoid them in the future. Tawbah means regaining one's essential purity after every spiritual defilement. Maintaining this psychological state requires certain essential elements. The first is self-examination (muhasabah) and the other is introversion or meditation (muraqabah).
Abstention (wara): Pious self-restraint: the highest level of wara' is to eschew anything that might distract one, even briefly, from the consciousness of Allah. Some Sufis define wara as conviction of the truth of Islamic tenets, being straightforward in belief and acts, steadfast in observing Islamic commandments, and careful in one's relations with God.
Asceticism (zuhd): Doing without what you do not need and making do with little. It is the emptiness of the heart that doesn't know any other commitment than what is in relation to God, or coldness of the heart and dislike of the soul in relation to the world. Such renowned Sufi leaders as Sufyan al-Thawri regarded zuhd as the action of the heart dedicated to Allah's approval and pleasure and closed to worldly ambitions.
Poverty (faqr): Poverty, both material and spiritual. This means denial of the nafs demands for pleasure and power, and dedication to the service of others instead of self-promotion. A dervish is also known as a fakir, literally a poor person. Poverty means lack of attachment to possessions and a heart that is empty of all except the desire for Allah.
Patience (ṣabr): Essential characteristic for the mystic, sabr literally means enduring, bearing, and resisting pain and difficulty. There are three types: sabr alal amal (consistent in practicing righteous deeds); sabr fil amal (patience in performing a righteous deed); sabr anil amal (patience in abstaining from haram). In many Quranic verses Allah praises the patient ones, declares His love for them, or mentions the ranks He has bestowed on them: "And Surely God is with the patient ones." (2:153)
Confidence (tawakkul): At this stage we realize everything we have comes from Allah. We rely on Allah instead of this world. There are three fundamental principles (arkan) of tawakkul: ma'rifat, halat and a'mal. The condition for achieving tawakkul is sincere acknowledgement of tauheed.
Contentment (riḍā’): Submission to qaḍā (fate), showing no rancor or rebellion against misfortune, and accepting all manifestations of Destiny without complaint. According to Dhul-Nun al-Misri, rida means preferring God's wishes over one's own in advance, accepting his Decree without complaint, based on the realization that whatever God wills and does is good. The state where pain is not felt is called riḍā-e-tab'i (natural): when riḍā’ prevails with pain it is riḍā-e-aqli (intellectual). The first state is a physical condition and is not incumbent. The second is an intellectual condition, which is required: results from muhabbat (love for Allah ).

Sufi sheikhs such as 'Alā' al-Dawlah Simnāni have described the maqāmāt in terms of the 'seven prophets' of one's inner being, with each prophet corresponding to one of man's inner states and also virtues. Others like Khwājah 'Abdallah Ansāri have gone into great detail in dividing the stages of tazkiah into a hundred stations. Nonetheless, through all these descriptions the main features of the stations marking the journey towards Allah are the same. One of the finest accounts of maqāmāt in Sufism is the Forty Stations (Maqāmāt-i Arba'in), written by the eleventh century murshid Abū-Sa'īd Abul-Khayr.

Māmulāt of Tazkiah
In order to combat and train the lower-self, Sufis practice fasting (ṣawm), food and drink deprivation (jūʿ'), wakefulness at night for the recitation of Quranic passages (qiyām al-layl), periods of seclusion (khalawāt), roaming uninhabited places in states of poverty and deprivation, and lengthy meditations (murāqaba, jam' al-hamm). The effortful path of self-denial and transformation through gradual maqāmāt is interwoven with effortless mystical experiences (aḥwāl).

The Persian murshid Abu al-Najib al-Suhrawardi further described this process by saying that it is only through constancy in action for God ('aml li- allāh), remembrance (dhikr allāh), recitation from the Quran, prayers and meditation (muraqabah) that a mystic can hope to obtain his objective, which is ubudiyyah – perfect obedience to Allah. Another practice that is often associated with Sufism is the spiritual concert, or "listening," samā', in which poetic recitations, music and dances are performed by the participants, sometimes in states of ecstasy and elation. Most Sufi ṭuruq have established graded programs in which initially every new seeker (murīdūn) is educated in the ritual known as zikr-al-lisani (zikr with the tongue) and is finally taught zikr-al-qalbi, which is practiced from the onset.

More About Ahwal

Excerpt from book reviews provided by "Der Nimatullahi Sufi-Orden", "Spiritual Poverty in Sufism

Spiritual Poverty is a cornerstone of classical Sufi practice. The term faqir (poor man or woman) is often used as a synonym for Sufi and darvish among the Sufis. The first essay in this book documents the development of the meaning of spiritual poverty in Sufism, followed by two essays which explore diverse definitions of the terms darvish and Sufi in Islamic mystical texts.

Chapters 4 and 5 constitute the only comprehensive study in English of the various gradations of mystical states (ahwal) and the hierarchical levels of spiritual stations (maqamat) by the Sufis. The final chapters focus on the concept of the 'Eternal Now' (waqt) and discuss the significance of breath in the spiritual method of the Sufis." 

'Al-Ghunya li-Talibi Tariq al-Haqq – 2', in 'Concerning contentment [rida].', says "Should contentment [rida] be classed as one of the spiritual states [ahwal], or as one of the spiritual stations [maqamat]?", and in another place later, same work, "But its final stage [nihaya] is one of the spiritual states [ahwal]..." These quotes are without going into detail, such as to answer the question presented. 

The webpage entitled 'SUFISM', says, The Sufi path contains many stages (Maqamat) and states (Ahwal). It begins with repentance when the seeker joins the order and prepares himself for initiation.... He passes through a number of spiritual stations and states clearly defined by Sufi teaching. These are the Sufi stations:... Linked to these stations are specific moods or emotions (ahwal) such as fear and hope, sadness and joy, yearning and intimacy...

SUFI ESOTERIC TERMINOLOGY: Ahwal – mystical states. 

With a translation of Ahwal:

Qasida Burda verses 35–36

Wa-'alaykum as-Salam wa-rahmatullah wa-barakatuh: What is the meaning of "muqtahim[i]" in the line of the Burda Shareef which states: "Li kulli hawlin min ahwal muqtahimi"?

Also, what is the translation of "Abara fee qawli laa minhu wa la n'ami"?

They are verses 35–36:

Nabiyyuna al-aamiru al-naahi fa-la ahadun abarra fi qawli "la" minhu wa-la "na'ami."

Huwa al-Habibu al-ladhi turja shafa'atuhu, li-kulli hawlin min al-ahwali muqtahimi!

Translation

Our Prophet who commands and forbids, so that none is more just than him in saying "no" or "yes":

He is the Beloved whose intercession is dearly hoped, for each disaster of the disasters that shall befall!" 

As can be seen, in the last line starting with 'hawlin', the corresponding translation starts with 'disaster', then, 'of the disasters', whereas the initial text, "min al-ahwali"; thereof, it is shown basic lughatul Arabiya [Arabic language], the word tense of 'hawlin' to 'al-ahwali'.

Article on Qaṣīda al-Burda (Arabic: قصيدة البردة, "Poem of the Mantle")

Quote provided is on direct subject of illustrating the breadth of translations of Ahwal; therewith, the quote is inserted without involvement in unanimity of agreement of approval of the entirety of the content of Qasida Burda.

Further on meanings of Ahwal, in answering, "Question: Does a non-verbal pronouncement of divorce count as a pronouncement of divorce? i.e. The man "says" it "aloud" in his mind (without moving lips, vocal cords, mouth)?

Answer: بسم الله الرحمن الرحيم Assalamu Alaykum. Allama Muhammad Qudri Basha in his al-Ahwal al-Shaksiyya mentions: A divorce is effected by a verbal pronouncement and by a formally written letter. (Al-Fawaid al-Aliyya ala al-Ahkam al-Shariyya fi al-Ahwal al-Shakhsiyya, Article 222, Maktaba Arafa). A formally written letter is one that is written to a third person. This will count as a divorce whether one intends it or not." 

It is indicative that al-Ahwal is used in places, places, spread. The purpose of including this in this article addendum is for broadness sake.

Salafi views 
Although highly critical of numerous Sufi practices, Muhammad ibn Abd al-Wahhab states: "We do not negate the way of the Sufis and the purification of the inner self (i.e., tazkiah) from the vices of those sins connected to the heart and the limbs as long as the individual firmly adheres to the rules of Shari‘ah and the correct and observed way. However, we will not take it on ourselves to allegorically interpret (ta’wil) his speech and his actions. We only place our reliance on, seek help from, beseech aid from and place our confidence in all our dealings in Allah Most High. He is enough for us, the best trustee, the best mawla and the best helper."

See also
 Islah
 Istighfar
 Taharat
 Tasawwuf
 Tawbah

Notes

References
J.M. Cowan (1994), The Hans Wehr Dictionary of Modern Written Arabic
John Esposito (2003), The Oxford Dictionary of Islam
Jean-Louis Michon (1999), The Autobiography of a Moroccan Soufi: Ahmad ibn 'Ajiba (1747–1809)
M. Masud (1996), Islamic Legal Interpretation: Muftis and Their Fatwas
Imam Ali, Nahjul Balagha: Sermons, Letters & Sayings of Imam Ali
 Muhammad Al-Munajjid -  Prophet's Methods Of Correcting People's Mistakes - (English)
Anas Karzoon (1997), Manhaj al-Islaami fi Tazkiyah al-Nafs
Ahmad Farid, The Purification of the Soul: Compiled from the Works of Ibn Rajab al-Hanbali, Ibn al-Qayyim and Al-Ghazali.
S.D. Goitein (1964), Jews and Arabs
Annemarie Schimmel (1975), Mystical Dimension of Islam
G. Böwering (1980), The Mystical Vision of Existence in Early Islam
C. Ernst (1984), Words of Ecstasy in Sufism
J.S. Trimingham (1982), The Sufi Orders in Islam
L. Lewisohn (ed.) (1999), The Heritage of Sufism, 3 vols.
A. Knysh, Islamic Mysticism. A Short History (2000)
Khalid bin Abdullah al-Musleh (2004), Reform of the hearts 
Khondokar Abdullah Zahangir (2007), Rahe Belayet (The way to friendship of Allah) 
Shaykh Imran ibn Adam, Tasawwuf and Tazkiyah
The meaning and origin of Akhlaq
The Path of the Wayfarer

Arabic words and phrases
Islamic terminology
Sufi philosophy
Quranic words and phrases
Hadith articles by importance